In the US, a chartered mark is a trademark or service mark which is given special statutory protection separate from the usual registration of trade marks and service marks.  A chartered mark, in effect, is a type of trademark/servicemark in which the organization is granted the mark "by charter", i.e. by express grant of the legislature.  When an organization is granted a chartered mark, no one else may use the same mark at all for any purpose.  (There are possible exceptions for organizations using the same or a similar mark before it was chartered.)

Examples of chartered marks in the United States include FDIC for the Federal Deposit Insurance Corporation; Boy Scouts and Girl Scouts for the Boy Scouts of America and the Girl Scouts of the USA, respectively; and Olympic for the United States Olympic Committee.

Trademark law